Jon Storm-Mathisen (born 16 January 1941 in Oslo) is a highly cited Norwegian neuroscientist known for his work on the morphology and immunocytochemistry of the central nervous system. He is a professor of medicine at the Department of Anatomy at the University of Oslo.

Storm-Mathiesen completed his examen artium at Oslo Cathedral School in 1959, graduated from the University of Oslo in 1965, and qualified as doctor of medicine from the same university in 1976. He is a member of the Norwegian Academy of Science and Letters.

References

External links
 Homepage at the University of Oslo (English)

1941 births
Living people
Norwegian neuroscientists
People educated at Oslo Cathedral School
University of Oslo alumni
Academic staff of the University of Oslo
Members of the Norwegian Academy of Science and Letters
Royal Norwegian Society of Sciences and Letters
Physicians from Oslo